Edoardo Ballerini (born March 20, 1970) is an American actor, narrator, writer, and film director. On screen he is best known for his work as junkie Corky Caporale in The Sopranos and the hotheaded chef in the indie film Dinner Rush (2001). Ballerini is a two-time winner of the Audio Publishers Association's Best Male Narrator Audie Award (2013, Beautiful Ruins by Jess Walter; 2019 Watchers by Dean Koontz) and the co-author of the Audible Original "The Angel of Rome" (2021), with Jess Walter. His directorial debut, Good Night Valentino, premiered at the 2003 Sundance Film Festival.

Early life and education
Ballerini was born to an Italian father, the poet Luigi Ballerini, and an American mother, the photo historian and writer Julia Ballerini. He grew up between New York City and Milan, Italy. He is a dual citizen, and bilingual. His early schooling took place in New York, at P.S. 41 and later Friends Seminary, before he left home at age 14 after his parents' divorce for boarding school at Deerfield Academy. From there, he attended Wesleyan University, graduating a Bachelor of Arts degree English after studying under Paul Horgan. The summer following his graduation, Ballerini was given a scholarship to study Latin in Rome with Father Reginald Foster, a Vatican priest. While in Italy, Ballerini discovered a group of international actors who were forming a theater company. He quit his studies and joined the troupe. The following fall, he attended regular acting classes in New York at HB Studio and the Lee Strasberg Theatre and Film Institute. He was then invited to become an observer at the Actors Studio.

Career

Film and television

Ballerini's first professional role on screen was as an autistic teenager on Law & Order (1995). Following that he had small roles in I Shot Andy Warhol (1996) and The Pallbearer (1996), opposite David Schwimmer. In 1997 he starred in the John Leguizamo comedy The Pest (1997) before appearing in Whit Stillman's The Last Days of Disco (1998) and Amos Kollek's Sue (1998), then again in starring roles in Martin Davidson's Looking for an Echo (2000) and the action blockbuster Romeo Must Die (2000).

That same year Ballerini was cast as the "star chef" in Bob Giraldi's Dinner Rush (2001) opposite Danny Aiello. The film grossed only $638,227 but received largely positive reviews.

Following the success of Dinner Rush Ballerini wrote, directed, produced and starred in "Good Night Valentino," a short film about 1920s film icon Rudolph Valentino. The film premiered at the 2003 Sundance Film Festival and was entered into the permanent archive at the Academy of Motion Picture Arts and Sciences in Los Angeles. The film was also presented at the National Museum of Cinema in Turin, Italy in 2009 as part of a Valentino retrospective. Emily Leider, in her biography of Valentino titled Dark Lover (2003), wrote that Ballerini "infuses his [Valentino] with exactly the right mix of pride, elegance, grace and anguish... on screen, Ballerini's resemblance to Valentino is uncanny."

Ballerini was also cast as another famous 1920s Italian, the anarchist and labor leader Carlo Tresca, in No God, No Master (2011).

In 2006 Ballerini was cast as junkie Corky Caporale, friend of Christopher Moltisanti in The Sopranos. He appeared in four episodes. This led to an eight episode appearance as Igantius D'Alessio in Boardwalk Empire in 2010. Ballerini was later offered a contract role in Quarry (2016) opposite Logan Marshall-Green and Peter Mullan. "Quarry" was cancelled after its first season.

Other film credits include Life is Hot in Cracktown (2009), opposite Illeana Douglas, Michael Almereyda's Experimenter (2015), opposite Peter Sarsgaard and Winona Ryder and First We Take Brooklyn (2018) opposite Harvey Keitel.

TV credits include roles on 24, the BBC's Ripper Street (2013), Elementary (2015-2016) and Neon Joe (2017).

Audiobooks 
Ballerini is a frequent and award-winning audiobook narrator. In 2007 he recorded his first book, Machiavelli's The Prince, as a favor for a friend who was starting a new studio. Ballerini considers Beautiful Ruins (2012) to be a career changing moment; prior to this he had only recorded a few books, and its success catapulted his audiobook career. Beautiful Ruins won the Audio Publishers Association award for best audiobook of the year on the solo male narrator category. Ballerini is also a two-time winner of Society of Voice Arts Awards.

He received Earphones Awards from AudioFile magazine for his recordings of Stephen Greenblatt's National Book Award-winning The Swerve, Paul Farmer's Haiti: After the Earthquake (with Meryl Streep and Eric Conger), and Kristopher Jansma's The Unchangeable Spots of Leopards. In a feature profile, The New York Times Magazine called him "The Voice of God", in part because of his narration of the Hebrew Bible. Other major titles include War and Peace, The Metamorphosis. His 135-hour recording of Karl Ove Knausgaards six-volume autobiographical opus, My Struggle which he considers his most ambitious, took him 200 hours over the course of five years to finish.

His short form narration work includes episodes of "Sunday Reads" for The New York Times The Daily Podcast, stories for the "Modern Love" Podcast, as well as "Sleep Stories" for the popular Calm app, and frequent narration of articles for The New Yorker, The Atlantic, The New York Times Magazine, Rolling Stone and Vanity Fair through the subscription service Audm.

Theater
Ballerini made his first professional appearance on stage as a child at the age of 10 at Theater for the New City, New York, in Mario Prosperi's "Uncle Mario." He subsequently joined the Italian Commedia dell'arte troupe "I giullari di piazza" for several performances. Stage credits as an adult include "Crossroads" at The Henry Street Settlement (1994), several pieces in "The Eugene O'Neill Project" (1995-1996) at The Actors Studio and The Eugene O'Neill Center, Stefanie Zadravec's "Honey Brown Eyes" (2010) on Theater Row, and John Jesurun's "Chang in a Void Moon" (1997-2015) at The Kitchen and other venues.

Personal life
Ballerini moved to Los Angeles in 2000 before eventually returning to the New York area,. Ballerini has a small sound studio in his house where he records books; the house was once owned by a silent movie star. He is married with two children.

Filmography

Film

Television

References

External links
Edoardo Ballerini Official Website

1970 births
Living people
Wesleyan University alumni
American male film actors
American male television actors
Male actors from New York City
Place of birth missing (living people)
Film directors from New York City
Friends Seminary alumni
Audiobook narrators
American people of Italian descent